Peloncillo National Forest was established as the Peloncillo Forest Reserve in Arizona and New Mexico on November 15, 1906 with .  It became a National Forest on March 4, 1907. On July 1, 1908 it was combined with the Chiricahua National Forest and the name was discontinued. Its lands presently exist as part of the Coronado National Forest.

Much of the forest was transferred out of the National Forest system to the Bureau of Land Management and the remainder, (now part of the Douglas Ranger District of Coronado) is at the extreme southern end of the Peloncillo Mountains in Cochise County, Arizona and Hidalgo County, New Mexico.

References

External links
 Forest History Society
 Listing of the National Forests of the United States and Their Dates (from the Forest History Society website) Text from Davis, Richard C., ed. Encyclopedia of American Forest and Conservation History. New York: Macmillan Publishing Company for the Forest History Society, 1983. Vol. II, pp. 743–788.
  – 
  – 

Former National Forests of Arizona
Former National Forests of New Mexico
Bureau of Land Management areas in New Mexico
Protected areas of Cochise County, Arizona
Protected areas of Hidalgo County, New Mexico
Coronado National Forest
Protected areas established in 1906
1906 establishments in Arizona Territory
1906 establishments in New Mexico Territory
1908 disestablishments in Arizona Territory
1908 disestablishments in New Mexico Territory
Protected areas disestablished in 1908